Fareham railway station is on the West Coastway Line situated about  from the town of Fareham in Hampshire, England.

History 
Fareham station was first opened by the London and South Western Railway (LSWR) in 1841 on the line from Eastleigh to Gosport.  Later additions in 1848 connected Fareham station with Southampton, Portsmouth and along the coast towards Brighton. These later lines are now the most valuable, but as a consequence of the later construction there is a sharp curve upon exiting the station to Portsmouth, and a lesser one towards Southampton. A 20 mph speed limit protects the area surrounding Fareham station, mainly due to the sharp curve on the Portsmouth side. The original line, now singled through Fareham Tunnel, to Eastleigh and London, is dead straight, as is the former Gosport route, which closed to passengers in 1953.  Track remains overgrown in places on the Gosport route, although most of it has now been cleared for a bus express route from Fareham to Gosport ferry operated by First Bus. The line formerly saw freight services to a Royal Navy ordnance factory at Bedenham into the 1990s but after closure the track was removed.

There was also a line to Alton via the Meon Valley (opening in 1903), branching from the Eastleigh route at Knowle, north of the tunnel. It was built initially as a fast route to the Isle of Wight - to express standards though only a single line on double track earthworks - at a time when Stokes Bay, not Portsmouth Harbour, was the primary rail-connected ferry terminus for the Island.  That route closed to passengers in 1955.

In the early 21st century a new footbridge and lifts were erected to the north of the station buildings and canopies. The lifts allows the station to comply with the Equality Act 2010, providing wheelchair access to all platforms. Related work has included fitting tactile strips to all three platforms. Work commenced in October 2008 and was undertaken by Osborne Rail Division. The ticket office was reopened with a new entrance to the platform at the south end of the corridor. Ticket barriers were also installed and a new station shop constructed at the end of the station building on Platform 3.

Description 
Fareham station is located on the West Coastway Line which runs between Brighton and Southampton Central.  It is now served by South Western Railway, Southern and Great Western Railway.

The station has three platforms:

Platform 1 is the main up platform and serves Southampton Central, Cardiff Central and London Waterloo via Winchester and Basingstoke.

Platform 2 is a bay platform and has very little planned use, however it is periodically used when late running Great Western and Southern services are terminated short of destination or during engineering works. It was formerly the main up platform, before the stone arched bridge over the A27 immediately south of the station was replaced, and the opportunity taken to ease the radius of the curve from Portsmouth by aligning the route into the current platform 1.

Platform 3 is the down platform for services towards Portsmouth Harbour, Brighton and London Victoria. The bay platform for services to Alton via the closed Meon Valley Line was on the opposite (car park) side of this platform, a short siding is all that remains at the north end of platform 3.

Services 

The typical off-peak service in trains per hour is:
 1 tph to  via 
 1 tph to  via 
 1 tph to  via 

References

External links 

Fareham
Railway stations in Hampshire
DfT Category C2 stations
Former London and South Western Railway stations
Railway stations in Great Britain opened in 1841
Railway stations served by Great Western Railway
Railway stations served by Govia Thameslink Railway
Railway stations served by South Western Railway
1841 establishments in England